Ram Prakash Singh (known as Prof. R. P. Singh) was an Indian scientist, educator and researcher. He works as Emeritus Scientist at IISER Pune. He is known for his works as Vice-Chancellor Lucknow University (years - 2005 to 2008) and as Professor and Head, Materials Science Centre, IIT Kharagpur. He is an alumnus of Glasgow University, Liverpool University and Allahabad University.

Career 
Singh is working on Polymer Science and Engineering - a part of Materials Science. He has research and teaching experience in India, United States, Iraq, France, Germany, Italy, and Russia.

He has 11 patents in his name. His research papers are published in International Journals. He published more than 200 peer reviewed papers. 

He has more than 51 years of research experience in the field of Polymers and Materials Science. His current research is focused on Polymer solar cells.

Recognition 

 2005 Flory Award

References

He has got more than 10000 citations to his credit.

University of Allahabad alumni
Alumni of the University of Glasgow
Alumni of the University of Liverpool
IIT Kharagpur
Indian materials scientists
Living people
Academic staff of the University of Lucknow
Year of birth missing (living people)